The Kamigin language, Kinamigin (Quinamiguin) is a Manobo language spoken on the island of Camiguin in the Philippines. It is declining as most inhabitants have shifted to Cebuano.

Grammar
Ethnologue lists the following grammatical features for Kinamiging.

VOS, VSO word order
prepositions
genitives after noun heads
articles, adjectives, and numerals before noun heads
relatives after noun heads
question word in sentence-initial position
word order distinguishes subjects, objects and indirect objects in some structures, word order distinguishes given and new information, topic and comment
affixes do not indicate case of noun phrases
verb affixes mark number
passives
causatives
comparatives

References

Manobo languages
Languages of Camiguin